Yeredon Saniona is a commune in the Cercle of Niono in the Ségou Region of Mali. The commune covers an area of approximately 307 square kilometers and includes 15 villages. In the 2009 census it had a population of 17,291. The center of local government (chef-lieu) is the village of Werekela.

References

External links
.
.

Communes of Ségou Region